The Church of Saint Nympha (Italian: Chiesa di Santa Ninfa or Santa Ninfa dei Crociferi) is a Baroque-Mannerist church of Palermo. The facade rises on Via Maqueda, a block north of the central intersection known as the Quattro Canti, in the quarter of Seralcadi, within the historic centre of Palermo. The church belongs to the Camillians (also known as "Crociferi").

History 
The church is dedicated to one of the female patron saints of Palermo: Ninfa or Nympha who had lived in Palermo was putatively martyred for her faith in the 4th century. It is one of the first buildings erected after the opening of Via Maqueda, the second most important street of the city. 

The order of the Camillians had been founded by the later canonized Camillus de Lellis in 1582, and rapidly spread throughout Italy. Its adherents, known for wearing cassocks with a red cross, and known as the Crociferi were in demand for their service in ministering to the sick.  

Construction of the church began on 10 August 1601 with funds assigned by the Senate of Palermo and donations. Saint Camillus de Lellis attended this inauguration. In the same area the house of the Crociferi was erected.

The original design was probably prepared in Rome. In Palermo many architects were involved in the construction: Giovanni Macolino, Giacomo Amato, Giuseppe Clemente Mariani, Ferdinando Lombardo and Giuseppe Venanzio Marvuglia. The church was open in 1660, but because of financial difficulties, the construction was completed only in 1750 with the conclusion of the façade designed by Ferdinando Lombardo. The church houses many artworks of important artists.

Some relics of Saint Camillus are held in the church.

Sir John Acton was buried here after his death in 1811.

Art

Paintings 
Oil on canvas:
 Nympha and the other Virgins of Palermo with Saint Joseph, Mary and the Most Holy Trinity, Gioacchino Martorana
 Saint Camillus ascends to Heaven, Gaspare Serenario
 Death of Saint Joseph, Guglielmo Borremans
 Holy Family, Guglielmo Borremans
 Saint Joseph the Carpenter, Guglielmo Borremans
 Martyrdom of Saint Venantius, unknown author
 God the Father, unknown author

Panel painting:
 Our Lady of Health, unknown author
 
Frescoes:
 Saint Paul and the Triumph of the Cross, Gioacchino Martorana
 Saint Jerome, Gioacchino Martorana
 Saint Gregory the Great, Gioacchino Martorana
 Saint Augustine, Gioacchino Martorana
 Saint Ambrose, Gioacchino Martorana
 Saint Philip Neri in Glory, Alessandro D'Anna
 Saint Magdalene penitent, Alessandro D'Anna
 Saint Liberalis, unknown author
 Saint Evansia, unknown author
 Adoration of the  Bronze Serpent, unknown author
 Assumption of the Virgin, unknown author

Sculptures 
High reliefs:
 Martyrdom of Saint Nympha, Gaspare Firriolo
 Saint Camillus takes care of the infirms, Vittorio Perez
 The groundbreaking of the church, Vittorio Perez

Statues:
 Saint John the Baptist, Giacomo Serpotta
 Mary Magdalene, Giacomo Serpotta
 Virgin Mary, Giacomo Serpotta
 Our Lady of Sorrows, Giuseppe Milanti
 Simeon, Andrea Sulfarello
 Jeremiah, Gaspare La Farina
 Heart of Jesus, unknown author
 Justice, unknown author
 Penance, unknown author

The church houses several funeral monuments.

See also 

 Seralcadi
 Via Maqueda
 Churches in Palermo

References

External links 
  Image gallery
  History of the church - Provincia Regionale di Palermo
  History of the church - sicilytourist.com

Ninfa
Baroque architecture in Palermo
Renaissance architecture in Palermo
17th-century Roman Catholic church buildings in Italy